Hall Garth Community Arts College, originally Hall Garth School, was a secondary school in Acklam, Middlesbrough, North Yorkshire, England.

The students of the school came from areas with higher than average levels of socio-economic deprivation. The number of students from minority ethnic groups, and those with learning difficulties and disabilities, were well above average.

In 2000, it became a performing arts school and, in 2007, was renamed to Hall Garth Community Arts College from Hall Garth School.

Fatal stabbing incident
Hall Garth was the scene of a fatal stabbing, on 28 March 1994, when Stephen Wilkinson burst into a maths classroom and stabbed several children including 12-year-old Nikki Conroy who died from her injuries. In October 2003 a permanent police presence was established on site. Wilkinson was subsequently convicted of manslaughter and was sentenced to indefinite detention at a psychiatric hospital. A school memorial garden was opened for Nikki, in March 2004.

Anti-bullying initiatives
The school established several initiatives in order to tackle bullying. The students made a video of an anti-bullying theatre performance in December 2004. Then in May 2005 the school hired an anti-bullying co-ordinator and set up a peer support group of older pupils.

Closure
Hall Garth Community Arts College and King's Manor School formally closed in 2010 and were replaced with Oakfields Community College.

References

Defunct schools in Middlesbrough
Educational institutions disestablished in 2010
2010 disestablishments in England